Koreno is a settlement in the Municipality of Lukovica in the eastern Upper Carniola region of Slovenia.

References

External links 
 
Koreno on Geopedia

Populated places in the Municipality of Lukovica